Roma Trastevere railway station is a major railway station serving the city and comune of Rome, Italy.  Opened in 1911, it forms part of the Pisa–Livorno–Rome, Rome–Capranica–Viterbo and Rome–Fiumicino railways.

The station is currently managed by Rete Ferroviaria Italiana (RFI).  However, the commercial area of the passenger building is managed by Centostazioni.  Train services are operated by Trenitalia.  Each of these companies is a subsidiary of Ferrovie dello Stato (FS), Italy's state-owned rail company.

Location
Roma Trastevere railway station is situated at Piazza Flavio Biondo, southwest of the city centre.  It is at the southern end of the Trastevere district, close to the districts of Marconi and Portuense.

History
The original Roma Trastevere railway station was more centrally located, at Piazza Ippolito Nievo.  That station replaced the Roma Porta Portese railway station, which had been opened on 24 April 1859, upon the inauguration of the Rome–Civitavecchia section of the Pisa–Livorno–Rome railway.

The present station was opened on 1 May 1911, together with minor deviations of both the Pisa–Livorno–Rome railway and the Rome–Capranica–Viterbo railway.  The old station continued to operate until 1950 as a goods yard and rolling stock workshop.  Its site is now occupied by the FS Experimental Institute.

In recent years, the present station has been the subject of renovations and improvements commissioned by Centostazioni.

Features

Roma Trastevere's passenger building was designed by Paolo Bo.  It is a large structure made up of several conjoined sections, ranging from two to four storeys in height. The ground floor level of the central section provides various facilities to passengers.

The station has six through tracks faced by platforms fitted with shelters and connected by a subway.  Operationally, it was previously classified as a junction station, but in 1990 it was downgraded to the status of a stopping point.

Today, the Ferrovie regionali del Lazio FR1, FR3 and FR5 commuter lines all pass through the station, which is also planned to be an interchange with the proposed Line D of the Metropolitana di Roma.

See also

History of rail transport in Italy
List of railway stations in Lazio
Rail transport in Italy
Railway stations in Italy

References

External links

Railway stations in Rome
Railway stations opened in 1911
Rome Q. XI Portuense
Rome Q. XII Gianicolense